The 1950 Wyoming Cowboys football team represented the University of Wyoming in the Skyline Conference during the 1950 college football season.  In their fourth season under head coach Bowden Wyatt, the Cowboys compiled a perfect 10–0 record (5–0 against Skyline opponents), won the Skyline Conference championship, ranked No. 12 in the final AP Poll, defeated Washington and Lee in the 1951 Gator Bowl, and outscored all opponents by a total of 363 to 59.

Halfback Eddie Talboom received All-American honors after the 1950 season. He was recognized as a first-team offense player by the International News Service and as a second-team player on offense by the Associated Press.

In 2000, Talboom became the first player in Wyoming program history to be inducted into the College Football Hall of Fame. Head coach Bowden Wyatt was also inducted into the College Football Hall of Fame as a coach in 1997.

Schedule

References

Wyoming
Wyoming Cowboys football seasons
Mountain States Conference football champion seasons
Gator Bowl champion seasons
College football undefeated seasons
Wyoming Cowboys football